Gregory Lamberson (born April 19, 1964) is an American filmmaker and author. He is known for writing novels such as Johnny Gruesome and the series The Jake Helman Files, and for directing the 1988 film Slime City. He is also one of the directors of the Buffalo Dreams Fantastic Film Festival.

Life and career
Lamberson was born in Gowanda, New York and grew up in the nearby village of Fredonia. Having studied filmmaking at the School of Visual Arts in Manhattan, his first appearance in a film was an uncredited role in the 1987 horror comedy I Was a Teenage Zombie. The next year, he directed and produced the cult film Slime City. In 1991, he wrote, directed, produced, and acted in the horror film Undying Love, and in 1999 did the same for the film Naked Fear. On May 19, 1999, he married Tamar Lamberson, and the couple had a daughter named Kaelin.

Lamberson went on to produce various low-budget horror films, including several directed by Sam Qualiana, such as the 2012 film Snow Shark, the 2014 film The Legend of Six Fingers, and the upcoming horror film Lake Effect. He directed the 2013 horror film Dry Bones, as well as the 2015 horror comedy Killer Rack, both of which feature his daughter Kaelin in minor roles. In 2010, Lamberson directed Slime City Massacre, a semi-sequel to his feature directorial debut.

Lamberson is also known for his novels. In 2002, he published Personal Demons the first of his series The Jake Helman Files, which features a former NYPD detective turned private investigator who encounters supernatural phenomena. He has since written and published five books in total in the series, with the most recent entry being Storm Demon in 2013. His 2007 novel Johnny Gruesome received several awards and nominations, including a nomination for the Superior Achievement in a Novel category in the 2009 Bram Stoker Awards.

Selected filmography

As director
 Slime City (1988)
 Undying Love (1991)
 Naked Fear (1999)
 Gruesome (2007 short)
 Slime City Massacre (2010)
 Dry Bones (2013)
 Gave Up the Ghost (2014 short)
 Killer Rack (2015)
 Johnny Gruesome (2018)
 Widow's Point (2019)

As producer
 Slime City (1988)
 Undying Love (1991)
 West New York (1996)
 Naked Fear (1999)
 Gruesome (2007 short)
 Slime City Massacre (2010)
 Snow Shark (2012)
 Dry Bones (2013)
 Gave Up the Ghost (2014 short)
 The Legend of Six Fingers (2014)
 Killer Rack (2015)
 Lake Effect (2016)
 Model Hunger (2016)

Selected bibliography
 The Jake Helman Files
 Personal Demons (2002)
 Desperate Souls (2010)
 Cosmic Forces (2011)
 Tortured Spirits (2012)
 Storm Demon (2013)
 Human Monsters (2015)
 Johnny Gruesome (2007)
 The Frenzy Wolves
 The Frenzy Way (2010)
 The Frenzy War (2012)
 The Julian Year (2014)
 Black Creek (2016)

Awards and nominations

Films

Novels

References

External links
 

1964 births
Living people
American horror novelists
American film producers
American screenwriters
Horror film directors